Brauksiepe is a surname. Notable people with the surname include:

 Aenne Brauksiepe (1912–1997), German politician
 Ralf Brauksiepe (born 1967), German politician